The Descartes Systems Group Inc. (commonly referred to as Descartes) is a Canadian multinational technology company specializing in logistics software, supply chain management software, and cloud-based services for logistics businesses.

Descartes is perhaps best known for its abrupt and unexpected turnaround in the mid-2000s after coming close to bankruptcy in the wake of the dot-com bubble collapse. It is also known as one of the earliest logistics technology companies to adopt an on-demand business model and sell its software as a service (SaaS) via the Internet. The company operates the Global Logistics Network, an extensive electronic messaging system used by freight companies, manufacturers, distributors, retailers, customs brokers, government agencies, and other interested parties to exchange logistics and customs information.

Headquartered in Waterloo, Ontario, Canada, Descartes is a publicly traded company with shares listed on the NASDAQ Stock Market (NASDAQ: DSGX) and Toronto Stock Exchange (TSX: DSG). It has offices in the Americas, Europe, the Middle East, Africa, and the Asia Pacific region.

History 
Descartes was founded in 1981.

In 1998, the company made an initial public offering on the Toronto Stock Exchange, where its common shares trade under the stock symbol DSG. Descartes was first listed on the NASDAQ Stock Market in 1999, with common shares trading under the symbol DSGX. Descartes’ share price peaked during the dot-com bubble and then fell precipitously in the subsequent crash.

In 2001, Descartes switched its business model from selling full-featured enterprise software licenses to providing on-demand software on a subscription basis, becoming one of the first SaaS providers in the logistics sector. After years of losses, Descartes came close to bankruptcy in 2004, prompting it to aggressively restructure. The company cut 35% of its workforce and initiated a sweeping transformation of its corporate culture under CEO Arthur Mesher, who was appointed in 2005.

The company returned to profitability in 2005, with one analyst describing this as "one of the most dramatic turnarounds in Canadian corporate history."

In December, 2013, Descartes was added to the S&P/TSX Composite Index, an index of the stock (equity) prices of the largest companies on the Toronto Stock Exchange.

By January, 2015, Descartes had posted 41 straight profitable quarters and was supplying logistics software and services to more than 10,000 logistics-centric businesses, such as ground transportation companies, airlines, ocean carriers, freight forwarders, manufacturers, distributors, and retailers. Its customers included American Airlines, Delta Air Lines, Air Canada, British Airways, Maersk Group, Hapag-Lloyd, Con-way, Kuehne + Nagel, DHL, The Home Depot, Sears Brands, Hallmark Cards, Hasbro, Volvo, Ferrellgas, Del Monte, and The Coca-Cola Company.

In 2018, Gartner ranked Descartes 6th in its list of the Top 20 Supply Chain Management Software Suppliers, based on revenue of $221 million.

In July 2020, Descartes Systems Group has confirmed that dnata is expanding Descartes Core Bluetooth Low Energy (BLE) readers through its regional freight operations to enable foreign mail, shipment, and freight monitoring. Groupe Descartes Services T.DSG stock up $0.68 to $71.47.

Acquisitions 
Acquisitions have played a key role in Descartes’ growth. By acquiring niche technology companies, Descartes has expanded its line of logistics software and services, enlarged its customer base, and extended its business geographically.

Acquisitions going back to 2006 are listed below.

Global Logistics Network 
Descartes’ cloud-based logistics messaging system, the Global Logistics Network (GLN), connects more than 13,000 customers in over 160 countries, making it one of the world’s largest logistics networks. Each year, the GLN carries more than 4.5 billion messages and manages more than 30 million shipping routes.

Companies use the network to oversee shipping orders, file customs paperwork, comply with security regulations, share information across international supply chains, and automate logistics processes. In 2015, Descartes signed a deal with German business software giant SAP SE that allows users of SAP’s transportation management software to access the GLN.

Conference 
Descartes holds an annual logistics technology conference for its users and partners. The eleventh Descartes "Evolution" conference was held in 2016.

References

External links 
 

Companies listed on the Toronto Stock Exchange
1981 establishments in Ontario
Software companies established in 1981
Companies based in Waterloo, Ontario
Software companies of Canada
Companies listed on the Nasdaq
Multinational companies headquartered in Canada
Business software companies
Supply chain software companies
1998 initial public offerings
Canadian companies established in 1981